Nilbog is "goblin" spelled backwards (an ananym). 

Nilbog can refer to:
Nilbog, a type of goblin from the Dungeons & Dragons universe
Nilbog, the name of a fictional town and county from Troll 2
Nilbog High, a fictional school from Guitar Hero II
Nilbog, a supervillain in the web serial Worm